Configfs is a RAM-based virtual file system provided by the 2.6 Linux kernel.

Details
Configfs appears similar to sysfs but they are in fact different and complementary. Configfs is for creating, managing and destroying kernel objects from user-space, and sysfs for viewing and manipulating objects from user-space which are created and destroyed by kernel space. It is typically mounted at /sys/kernel/config (or more rarely at /config).

See also
tmpfs
sysctl – an interface for examining and dynamically changing parameters in the BSD and Linux operating systems

References

External links
Configfs - the API
Documentation/configfs/configfs.txt

Free special-purpose file systems
Pseudo file systems supported by the Linux kernel
Interfaces of the Linux kernel